Dead Sea Scrolls: Life and Faith in Ancient Times, also known as Dead Sea Scrolls: The Exhibition, is a travelling exhibition of artifacts from the ancient Kingdoms of Israel and Judah, including a select number of the Dead Sea Scrolls. The exhibition was created by the Israel Antiquities Authority with items from the Israel National Treasures Department, and was produced by Discovery Times Square and the Franklin Institute. The exhibition claims to be the largest display of ancient Israeli artifacts ever displayed outside of Israel.

Tour history
The exhibition first opened in New York City on October 28, 2011, under the title Dead Sea Scrolls: Life and Faith in Biblical Times. It is curated by Dr. Risa Levitt Kohn of San Diego State University, and Debora Ben Ami of the Israel Antiquities Authority.

On display
The exhibition features twenty of the Dead Sea Scrolls, displayed ten at a time. About 600 artifacts from the ancient Kingdoms of Israel and Judah are also displayed, including a stone block from the Western Wall of Jerusalem's Temple Mount.

Tour schedule

References

Dead Sea Scrolls
Traveling exhibits
Archaeological corpora
Essene texts
Hebrew manuscripts
Manuscripts
2nd-century BC biblical manuscripts
1st-century BC biblical manuscripts